Taede Anne Smedes (born 3 July 1973 in Drachten) is a Dutch philosopher of religion specializing in the relationship between religion and science. He received a Ph.D. degree from the University of Groningen in 2004 for a thesis on Avoiding Balaam's Mistake: Exploring Divine Action in an Age of Scientism.

Books

Authored

 Taede Smedes (2006). God en de menselijke maat [God and the human proportion]. Zoetermeer: Meinema.
 Taede Smedes (2009). God én Darwin: Geloof kan niet om evolutie heen. Nieuw Amsterdam.
 Taede Smedes (2016). God, iets of niets? De postseculiere maatschappij tussen geloof en ongeloof. University of Amsterdam Press.
 Taede Smedes (2018). Thuis in de kosmos: Het Epos van Evolutie en de vraag naar de zin van ons bestaan. University of Amsterday Press.

Edited
 Willem Drees, Hubert Meisinger, and Taede A. Smedes, eds. (2008). Creation's Diversity: Voices from Theology and Science. London: T&T Clark.
 Dirk Evers, Antje Jackelén, and Taede A. Smedes, eds. (2010). How Do We Know? Understanding in Science and Theology. London: T & T Clark.
 Palmyre Oomen and Taede Smedes, eds. (2010). Evolutie, cultuur en religie: Perspectieven vanuit biologie en theologie. Kampen: Klement.
 Dirk Evers, Antje Jackelén, and Taede A. Smedes, eds. (2012). Is Religion Natural? London: T & T Clark.

References

External links
 Smedes's Homepage
 

1973 births
Living people
21st-century Dutch philosophers
People from Drachten
University of Groningen alumni